Adel Bousmal (born 1 May 1985) is an Algerian handball goalkeeper.

He competed for the Algerian national team at the 2015 World Men's Handball Championship in Qatar.

He also participated at the 2011 and 2013 World Championships.

References

1985 births
Living people
Algerian male handball players
Place of birth missing (living people)
21st-century Algerian people